Scaphopetalum parvifolium is a species of plant in the family Malvaceae. It is endemic to Nigeria.  It is threatened by habitat loss.

References

Endemic flora of Nigeria
parvifolium
Vulnerable plants
Taxonomy articles created by Polbot